Hugo Cerqueira Pinto Basto (born 14 May 1993) is a Portuguese professional footballer who plays for Cypriot club AEL Limassol as a central defender.

Club career
Born in Porto, Basto was a youth player at both of his hometown's major clubs, Boavista F.C. and FC Porto. He began his senior career at nearby Varzim S.C. in the third division, playing regularly in his one season. After 18 months at S.C. Braga B in the Segunda Liga, he signed for Primeira Liga side F.C. Arouca in February 2015, on a deal until the summer of 2018.

On 8 March 2015, Basto was sent off in a 3–1 home loss against S.L. Benfica for a foul on Lima. His first top-flight goal came on 19 April to open a 2–0 away victory over fellow strugglers F.C. Penafiel. On 21 May 2017, as the team ended their stay with a 4–2 defeat at G.D. Estoril Praia, he was given a red card after 40 minutes for an aggression towards Bruno Gomes.

Basto was due to return to the top tier with G.D. Chaves in January 2018, but the club accidentally registered Victor Massaia – who went the other way to Arouca – in his place. By the new season, he was down the defensive pecking order.

On 7 August 2020, Basto joined Estoril in division two. A year later, having won promotion as champions, he moved abroad for the first time alongside teammate Harramiz to Azerbaijan's Neftçi PFK, on a two-year contract. He left the latter on 3 June 2022 by mutual agreement.

International career
In March 2016, manager Rui Jorge called up Basto for the under-23 team for a friendly against Mexico, ahead of the Olympics in Brazil. He played the final 14 minutes of the 4–0 win in Angra do Heroísmo.

Honours
Estoril
Liga Portugal 2: 2020–21

References

External links

1993 births
Living people
Portuguese footballers
Footballers from Porto
Association football defenders
Primeira Liga players
Liga Portugal 2 players
Segunda Divisão players
Varzim S.C. players
S.C. Braga B players
F.C. Arouca players
G.D. Chaves players
G.D. Estoril Praia players
Azerbaijan Premier League players
Neftçi PFK players
Cypriot First Division players
AEL Limassol players
Portugal youth international footballers
Portuguese expatriate footballers
Expatriate footballers in Azerbaijan
Expatriate footballers in Cyprus
Portuguese expatriate sportspeople in Azerbaijan
Portuguese expatriate sportspeople in Cyprus